The Newton scale is a temperature scale devised by Isaac Newton in 1701.
He called his device a "thermometer", but he did not use the term "temperature", speaking of "degrees of heat" (gradus caloris) instead.
Newton's publication represents the first attempt to introduce an objective way of measuring (what would come to be called) temperature (alongside the Rømer scale published at nearly the same time).

Newton used linseed oil as thermometric material  and measured its change of volume against his reference points. He set as 0 on his scale "the heat of air in winter at which water begins to freeze" (Calor aeris hyberni ubi aqua incipit gelu rigescere), reminiscent of the standard of the modern Celsius scale (i.e. 0 °N = 0 °C), but he has no single second reference point; he does give the "heat at which water begins to boil" as 33, but this is not a defining reference; the values for body temperature and the freezing and boiling point of water suggest a conversion factor between the Newton and the Celsius scale of between about 3.08 (12 °N = 37 °C) and 3.03 (33 °N = 100 °C) but since the objectively verifiable reference points given result in irreconcilable data (especially for high temperatures), no unambiguous "conversion" between the scales is possible.

The linseed thermometer could be used up to the melting point of tin. For higher temperatures, Newton used a "sufficiently thick piece of iron" that was heated until red-hot and then exposed to the wind. On this piece of iron, samples of metals and alloys were placed, which melted and then again solidified on cooling. Newton then determined the "degrees of heat" of these samples based on the solidification times, and tied this scale to the linseed one by measuring the melting point of tin in both systems.
This second system of measurement led Newton to derive his law of convective heat transfer, also known as Newton's law of cooling.

In his publication, Newton gives 18 reference points (in addition to a range of meteorological air temperatures), which he labels by two systems, one in  arithmetic progression and the other in geometric progression, as follows:

See also
 Comparison of temperature scales
 List of obsolete units of measurement

References

External links
 Photo of an antique thermometer backing board c. 1758—marked in four scales; the first is Newton's.

Obsolete units of measurement
Scales of temperature